The Kunsthaus Zürich is in terms of area the biggest art museum of Switzerland and houses one of the most important art collections in Switzerland, assembled over time by the local art association called . The collection spans from the Middle Ages to contemporary art, with an emphasis on Swiss art.

Architecture
The old museum part was drawn-up by architects Karl Moser and Robert Curjel and opened in 1910. Particularly notable are the several preserved Moser interiors in the original section of the museum, decorated in masterful Neo-Grec version of Secession style.  The bas-reliefs on the facade are by Moser's longtime collaborator Oskar Kiefer. The original museum building was extended in 1925, 1958 and 1976.

A $230 million extension by London-based David Chipperfield was opened in 2020. Half of the extension's budget came from the city and canton of Zurich, with the other half provided by private donors. Chipperfield's design is a massive rectangular sandstone-covered building. The extension will add  of galleries, increasing display space by 78%. The Kunsthaus will become the largest Swiss art museum, overtaking the Kunstmuseum Basel in the available space but not the collection. The two upper floors will be for art, with facilities at ground level and a basement link under the street to the original museum across the street in Heimplatz.

Lydia Escher (1858–1891), being a prominent Zürich patron of the arts, was honored by the Gesellschaft zu Fraumünster association on the occasion of her 150th anniversary by a commemorative plaque, located at the front of the building. The place was baptized on 20 August 2008 by the city of Zürich as Lydia Welti-Escher Hof.

Collection
The museum's collection includes major works by artists including Claude Monet (several works including an enormous water lily painting), Edvard Munch, Pablo Picasso, Jacques Lipchitz and the Swiss Alberto Giacometti. Other Swiss artists such as Johann Heinrich Füssli, Ferdinand Hodler or from recent times, Pipilotti Rist and Peter Fischli are also represented. In addition, works by Vincent van Gogh, Édouard Manet, Henri Matisse and René Magritte can be found here.

Management

Leadership
 1909–1949: Wilhelm Wartmann
 1950–1975: René Wehrli
 1976–2000: Felix Baumann
 2000–present: Christoph Becker

Attendance
In 2013, the Kunsthaus had 315,000 visitors. In a press release (dating 12 January 2017) the institution declared to have reached a record of 320'000 visitors in 2016. On Wednesday admission to the Collection is free of charge for all visitors.

Public transport
The gallery is served by a stop on the Zürich tram system, known as Kunsthaus. This is located on Pfauenplatz, between the museum building and the Schauspielhaus Zürich.

Gallery

Controversy
The integrated artworks from the collection of the arms dealer Emil Bührle has caused discussion and criticism due to concern that some of the artworks may have been sold under duress by Jews persecuted by Nazis during the Third Reich. Critics say that the ownership history of the artworks has not been sufficiently clarified and, in January 2021, a petition was launched to demand access for impartial international researchers.

References

External links 

 , with information on its history and collections
 Official online collection
Kunsthaus Zürich within Google Arts & Culture

Art museums and galleries in Zurich
Altstadt (Zürich)
Cultural property of national significance in the canton of Zürich
Art museums established in 1910
Buildings and structures completed in 1910
1910 establishments in Switzerland
Neoclassical architecture in Switzerland